Tom Hennesy (August 4, 1923 – May 23, 2011) was an American actor and stuntman. He is known for playing the Gill-man (on land) in Revenge of the Creature, the second installment of the Creature from the Black Lagoon trilogy.

Early life
Hennesy was born in Los Angeles, California. He attended the University of Southern California and the University of California, Los Angeles.

Career
Hennesy began his movie and television career as a stuntman and actor, while he was in college and playing football at USC. Hennesy played the title role in the classic Universal horror film "Revenge Of The Creature" (the sequel to the Creature From The Black Lagoon). Hennesy served in the United States Navy in World War II. Hennesy acted and performed stunts in numerous John Wayne and John Ford films. Hennesy was the stunt double for many stars, including Rock Hudson, Randolph Scott, Rod Cameron, Jeff Chandler, and more.

Hennesy also worked as a general secondary, as well as elementary school, teacher in many Hollywood studios. His celebrity students included, among others, Natalie Wood, Annette Funicello, Paul Anka, Sal Mineo, Tim Considine, Molly Bee, Tommy Rettig, and Lauren Chapin.

Actor/Filmography
It Should Happen to You (1954) - Board Member (uncredited)
Prince Valiant (1954) - Knight (uncredited)
The Long Gray Line (1955) - Cadet Dotson (uncredited)
Prince of Players (1955) - Man in Tavern (uncredited)
Revenge of the Creature (1955) - The Gill Man (on Land) / Marineland Diver (uncredited)
The Road to Denver (1955) - Man (uncredited)
Onionhead (1958) - Minor Role (uncredited)
The Buccaneer (1958) - Pirate (uncredited)
The Alamo (1960) - Bull (uncredited)
North to Alaska (1960) - Outlaw (uncredited)
The Comancheros (1961) - Gordo - Gralie's Bodyguard (uncredited)
The Man Who Shot Liberty Valance (1962) - Buck Langhorn (uncredited)
The War Wagon (1967) - Bartender (uncredited)
The Green Berets (1968) - Soldier (uncredited)
Big Jake (1971) - Mr. Sweet (uncredited)
Squares (1972) - Hilly (final film role)

Television
The Mickey Rooney Show - episode - Tiger Mulligan (1954) - Jack Corey
The Mickey Rooney Show - episode - The Basketball Star (1955) - Tom
Further Adventures of Spin and Marty (1956) - North Fork Counselor
26 Men- episode - Cattle Embargo (1958) - Jeff Conley
Colt .45 - episode - Amnesty (1959) - Harry
Tales of Wells Fargo - episode - The Barefoot Bandit (1961) - Miller Sledge
Thriller - episode - The Return of Andrew Bentley (1961) - The Familiar
Gunsmoke - episode - Cody's Code (1962) - Art (uncredited)
Have Gun - Will Travel  - episode - Taylor's Woman (1962) - Clyde Moss
Temple Houston - episode - The Law and Big Annie (1964)
Hondo - episode - Hondo and the Comancheros (1967) - Poker Player (uncredited)

Stunt man (Filmography) (All uncredited)
Iron Man (1951)
Jack and the Beanstalk (Stunt Double: Buddy Bear) (1952)
Trouble Along the Way (1953)
The President's Lady (Stunt Double: Charlton Heston) (1953)
The Robe (1953)
The High and the Mighty (1954)
The Caine Mutiny (1954)
Prince of Players (1955)
The Road to Denver (1955)
Cheyenne (Stunt Double: Clint Walker) (TV series) (1955)
Blood Alley (1955)
The Ten Commandments (1956)
Onionhead (1958)
The Buccaneer (1958)
The Horse Soldiers (1959)
The Alamo (1960)
North to Alaska (1960)
The Comancheros (1961)
The Man Who Shot Liberty Valence (1962)
Donovan's Reef (1963)
McLintock! (1963)
Stagecoach (1966)
The War Wagon (1967)
The Green Berets (1968)
Big Jake (Stunt Double: Gregg Palmer) (1971)

References

External links

American male film actors
20th-century American male actors
Male actors from Los Angeles
Military personnel from California
American stunt performers
1923 births
2011 deaths
United States Navy personnel of World War II